The  was a centrist to centre-left political party in Japan, and one of the forerunners to the Democratic Party of Japan formed in 1998. Its two leading members, Yukio Hatoyama and Naoto Kan, subsequently and sequentially became Prime Ministers at the end of the first decade of the 21st century.

History
The party was founded on 29 September 1996 by sitting members of the Diet, and was composed mostly of former Sakigake and Japan Socialist Party politicians who did not support an alliance with the ruling Liberal Democratic Party. Its initial leaders were Yukio Hatoyama and Naoto Kan, formerly members of Sakigake. At its formation, it had 39 parliamentarians.

The party won 52 seats in the 1996 general election, becoming the second-largest opposition party after the New Frontier Party.

In April 1998, the party was augmented by former members of the New Frontier Party, which had collapsed in December 1997, increasing it to 90 seats. It then merged with the  Good Governance Party (Minseitō), New Fraternity Party and Democratic Reform Party to create Democratic Party of Japan.

Presidents of DPJ

Election results

House of Representatives

References

Centrist parties in Japan
Centre-left parties in Asia
Defunct liberal political parties
Defunct political parties in Japan
Liberal parties in Japan
Political parties disestablished in 1998
Political parties established in 1996
1996 establishments in Japan
1998 disestablishments in Japan